Tyra West – F3 pipeline is a  long natural gas submarine pipeline connecting Danish and Dutch continental shelf pipeline systems. It facilitates the export of Danish gas into North West Europe. The  pipeline, which cost over US$200 million, runs from the Maersk-operated Tyra West platform on the Danish continental shelf to the F3 – FB platform on the Dutch continental shelf. From F3 – FB platform, gas is fed through the NOGAT pipeline system to the Netherlands natural gas hub in Den Helder.

The pipeline is operated by Maersk Oil & Gas and owned by Royal Dutch Shell (23%), TotalEnergies (19.5%), Chevron Corporation (7.5%) and Energinet (50%). It is operated by Maersk Oil. The pipeline gives each owner divided rights to transport gas from Denmark for subsequent sale at Den Helder.

References

Energy infrastructure completed in 2004
North Sea energy
Natural gas pipelines in Denmark
Natural gas pipelines in the Netherlands
Shell plc
Chevron Corporation
Maersk Oil
Denmark–Netherlands relations